Field of Lost Shoes is a 2014 American war drama film directed by Sean McNamara and written by Dave Kennedy and Thomas Farrell. The film stars Nolan Gould, Lauren Holly, Jason Isaacs, Tom Skerritt, Keith David and David Arquette. It is based on the true story of a group of cadets from the Virginia Military Institute who participated in the Battle of New Market against Union forces during the American Civil War. The battle was fought in the Shenandoah Valley of Virginia on May 15, 1864. The film's title refers to the large number of soldiers' boots left on the battlefield due to the muddy conditions during the battle. Ten cadets died in the battle.

The film was released in Europe under the title Battlefield of Lost Souls.

Cast

Production
The film's shooting locales include Powhatan, Virginia, Virginia Military Institute (VMI) and Lexington, Virginia. The film's world premiere was held on May 19, 2014 at the GI Film Festival.

Reception
On Metacritic, the film has a score of a 28% based on reviews from 5 critics, indicating "generally unfavorable reviews." On Rotten Tomatoes, it has a score of 40% based on reviews from 5 critics.

The film was roundly criticized for its misleading depiction of Southern attitudes toward slavery. In a review of the film, Jeffrey Evan Brooks, author of alternate history novels about the Civil War, criticized the portrayal of the VMI cadets as being opposed to slavery. A reviewer for the Hollywood Reporter wrote "Amazingly, none of the staunch Southerners seem to hold any negative feelings toward blacks, defending the Institute’s beloved cook “Judge” (Keith David) from persecution and stopping to rescue a young slave woman trapped under a fallen carriage." Writing for the Orlando Sentinel, critic Roger Moore noted that "cadets sympathetically help slaves at every turn, even though this was the patrician class that insisted upon the war and the preservation of that 'peculiar institution.'" Nick Shager's review in The Village Voice was entitled "Civil War Drama Field of Lost Shoes Argues No Confederates Were Racist."

Further criticism came in a 2019 report by Tom Nash and Kristin Reed on the government transparency news site MuckRock. The authors, noting the revisionist nature of the film, found that the state of Virginia had given one million dollars in public money to fund the film.

References

External links
 

2014 war drama films
American Civil War films
American war drama films
Battle of New Market
Brookwell McNamara Entertainment films
Films about war crimes
Films directed by Sean McNamara
Films scored by Frederik Wiedmann
Films set in 1864
Films set in Richmond, Virginia
Films set in Virginia
Films shot in Virginia
Cultural depictions of Ulysses S. Grant
Depictions of Abraham Lincoln on film
2014 drama films
Lost Cause of the Confederacy
2010s English-language films
2010s American films